Paraclinus altivelis, the topgallant blenny, is a species of labrisomid blenny endemic to the Gulf of California where it can be found in the vicinity of reefs at depths of from .

References

altivelis
Fish described in 1881
Taxa named by William Neale Lockington